Quernheim is a municipality in the district of Diepholz, in Lower Saxony, Germany. It is part of the Altes Amt Lemförde and has a population of about 480 inhabitants.

It is known for being the smallest municipality in Germany with a fully functioning public cinema; the "Lichtburg" is regarded as a local institution with its 1950s-style interior design (however it uses modern technology to screen films on current release).

References

External links

Diepholz (district)